The Tomb of the People's Heroes is located in Zagreb's central graveyard, Mirogoj. It was designed by the Croatian sculptor Đuro Kavurić and built in 1968. Buried in the tomb are not only the recipients of the Order of the People's Hero, but also some of the most notable workers' movement activists of Croatia and Yugoslavia.

During the night of February 1, 2001, unknown group of vandals activated an explosive in front of the Tomb, which caused serious damage. Some Croatian officials strongly opposed this act of vandalism. The damage has been repaired.

List of people buried in the tomb

Names written on the right panel
 Janko Mišić (1900–1929), secretary of the Central committee of SKOJ
 Zlatko Šnajder (1903–1931), secretary of the Central committee of SKOJ
 Josip Adamić (1907–1931), member of the Local committee of the Communist Party of Yugoslavia (CPY) Zagreb and the secretary of the Regional committee of SKOJ for Croatia
 Nikola Hećimović (1900–1929), secretary of the "International Red Aid"
 Rade Končar (1911–1942), First secretary of the CC of the Communist party of Croatia (CPC), commander of the  Operational party council for Croatia and People's Hero of Yugoslavia
 Vojin Kovačević (1913–1941), member of the Bureau of the Local committee of the CPC for Zagreb and People's Hero
 Đuro Salaj (1889–1958), president of the Unions Alliance of Yugoslavia
 Stjepan Debeljak (1908–1968), politician and People's Hero
 Kata Pejnović (1899–1966), politician and People's Hero
 Rade Grmuša (1907–1975), major general of Yugoslav People's Army (YPA) and People's Hero
 Mile Počuča (1899–1980), politician and People's Hero
 Izidor Štrok (1911–1984), general of the YPA and People's Hero
 Dušan Egić (1916–1985), lieutenant general of the YPA and People's Hero
 Dinko Šurkalo (1920–2010), admiral of the Yugoslav Navy and People's Hero
 Slavko Komar (1918–2012), politician and People's Hero
 Rade Bulat (1920–2013), general of the YPA and People's Hero

Names written on the left panel
 Pero Popović Aga (1905–1930), secretary of the Central committee of SKOJ
 Josip Debeljak (1902–1931), secretary of the Central committee of SKOJ
 Josip Kolumbo (1905–1930), secretary of the Central committee of SKOJ
 Paja Marganović (1904–1929), secretary of the Central committee of SKOJ
 Josip Kraš (1900–1941), member of the CC of the CPC and the Central committee of the CPY, one of the organizers of the antifascist uprising in Karlovac and People's Hero
 Janko Gredelj (1916–1941), one of the organizers of the antifascist struggle in Zagreb and People's Hero
 Božidar Maslarić (1895–1963), politician and People's Hero
 Većeslav Holjevac (1917–1970), politician, mayor of Zagreb and People's Hero
 Uroš Krunić (1914–1973), major general of the YPA and People's Hero
 Pavle Vukomanović (1903–1977), lieutenant of the YPA and People's Hero
 Dušan Ćorković (1921–1980), colonel general JNA of the YPA and People's Hero
 Adam Petrović (1913–1984), politician and People's Hero
 Stevan Opsenica (1913–2002), major general of the YPA and People's Hero
 Milan Kuprešanin (1911–2005), colonel general of the YPA and People's Hero
 Franjo Knebl (1915–2006), major general of the YPA and People's Hero
 Milutin Baltić (1920–2013), politician and People's Hero

See also
 Tomb of the People's Heroes, Belgrade
 Tomb of the People's Heroes, Ljubljana

References

1968 establishments in Yugoslavia
Buildings and structures completed in 1968
Buildings and structures in Zagreb
Tourist attractions in Zagreb
World War II memorials in Croatia
Tomb of the People
Tombs
Yugoslav World War II monuments and memorials